The economy of the state of Florida is the fourth-largest in the United States, with a $1.4trillion gross state product (GSP) as of 2022. If Florida were a sovereign nation (2022), it would rank as the world's 16th-largest economy according to the International Monetary Fund, ahead of Indonesia and behind Mexico. Agriculture, tourism, industry, construction, international banking, biomedical and life sciences, healthcare research, simulation training, aerospace and defense, and commercial space travel contribute to the state's economy.

Overview 

Florida's economy ranks among the largest in the world. As of 2021, the gross state product (GSP) is about $1.2trillion, the fourth largest economy in the United States. Florida is responsible for 5.23% of the United States' approximately $21trillion gross domestic product (GDP). , Florida's nominal GDP is larger than all but 15 countries; if it were a sovereign nation, it would be ranked ahead of Indonesia and behind Mexico. In terms of Purchasing Power Parity, it is larger than all but 24 countries. Agriculture, tourism, industry, construction, international banking, biomedical and life sciences, healthcare research, simulation training, aerospace and defense, and commercial space travel contribute to the state's economy.

The five largest sectors of employment in Florida are: trade, transportation, and utilities; government; professional and business services; education and health services; and leisure and hospitality. In output, the five largest sectors are: finance, insurance, real estate, rental, and leasing, followed by professional and business services; government and government enterprises; educational services, health care, and social assistance; and retail trade.

In 2017, Florida became the United States' eighth largest exporter of trade goods. Florida's top countries for export are Brazil, Canada, Mexico, Germany, and Colombia. In 2017, Florida became the United States' tenth largest importer of trade goods. Florida imported US$75.4billion worth of goods globally in 2017. The value of Florida's imports equals 3.2% of United States' overall imported products for 2017. Florida's top countries for imports are China, Mexico, Canada, Germany, and France.

The Miami Metropolitan Area has the highest GDP of all the metro areas in Florida with $344.9billion in 2017. This is more than twice the number of the next metro area, the Tampa Bay Area, which has a GDP of $145.3billion. The economy of Florida is driven almost entirely by its nineteen metropolitan areas. In 2004, they had a combined total of 95.7% of the state's domestic product.

Per capita GDP in 2017 was $39,842, ranking 40th in the nation. Per capita income varies widely by geographic region and profession. North Florida and the rural counties of the Florida Panhandle are the most impoverished in the state. Florida has a poverty rate of 14.0%, the seventeenth lowest of any state in the country. Many coastal cities include some of the wealthiest per-capita areas in the United States.

In 2018, there were more than 427,824millionaires in the state, the fourth-highest number in the nation.

For 2018–19, the approved state budget is $88.7billion, a 4.4% increase over the previous 2017–18 budget of $84.9billion. Chief Executive Magazine named Florida the third "Best State for Business" in 2011.

In 2022, as job numbers continue to surge, Florida's unemployment rate dipped to 2.7 percent in July which hit historic low.

Personal income 

 
In 2017, Florida's per capita personal income was $47,684, ranking 26th in the nation. The state's unemployment rate in September 2018 was 3.5% and ranked as the 18th lowest in the United States. Florida is one of seven states that does not impose a personal income tax.

In 2017, Florida had a personal income of $1,000,624,065,000. This personal income ranked 4th in the United States.

Florida's constitution establishes a state minimum wage, which is adjusted annually for inflation. , Florida's minimum wage was $6.98 for tipped positions, and $10.00 for non-tipped positions, which was higher than the federal rate of $7.25. The wage will increase by $1 per hour yearly, until 2026 when the minimum wage for non-tipped positions will reach $15 per hour.

Florida has two cities in the top 25 cities in the U.S. with the highest average credit card debt, Miami and Tampa.

The poverty rate in Florida in 2018 was 14%, down from a peak of 17.1% in 2012.

Sectors

Agriculture 
Florida was ranked in 2019, "first in the value of production for fresh market bell peppers and tomatoes, as well as grapefruit, oranges, sugarcane, and watermelons" in the United States according to Florida Agriculture by the Numbers. In 2002 peppers and tomatoes were #1 and #2 in dollar value for the state and citrus fruit, especially oranges, were also a major part of the economy. By 2019 tomatoes were #1, oranges #2, and peppers were #3. Of exports, meat is Florida's biggest earner. Florida produces the majority of citrus fruit grown in the United States.

Strawberry 
Strawberry is another major crop here. Florida is second only to California for strawberry production by volume and by dollars per year and the Plant City area grows  of America's winter strawberries. The  represents growers here. Strawberry gray mold is economically important. This is the Botrytis Fruit Rot of strawberries caused by Botrytis cinerea. (See .) Growers here ship strawberries December to April. The state's Strawberry Festival is held in March every year in Plant City. Anthracnose is a common disease of this crop, see . The University of Florida operates one of the most important strawberry demonstration breeding programs in North America.  was developed partly from the experience of this program with the need to combine desirable strawberry qualities with resistance, an integral part of the  program for Rosaceae in America. They adapted Axiom's 90k SNP array to a more economical 35k for genomic selection in the program. Molecular breeding has improved greatly in the few years  and the rapid generation cycle of strawberry also helps to speed up breeding. This program bred Phytophthora cactorum root rot resistance into their new cv. '', and for an even better example, they were able to pyramid together three disease resistance traits, to various Xanthomonas, Phytophthora, and Colletotrichum, into another cultivar. Molecular breeding is usually suitable for monogenic traits, while polygenics are handled by genome-wide analysis. Genomics proved better than pedigree records for predicting actually results. These results lead the program to combine both genomic and locus-specific testing for their routine breeding. (Mycosphaerella fragariae/Ramularia tulasnei, Ramularia or Ramularia Leaf Spot) is common here.

cv. 'Camino Real' is unusually vulnerable to Botrytis Fruit Rot in the conditions around the University of Florida's Gulf Coast Research and Education Center in Dover. Chandler et al., 2006 finds 'CR' is the worst among several common varieties, although '' can be close. It is possible that the Botrytis problem in 'CR' could be remedied with different fungicide timing. (See also .)

cv. '' was developed at U Fla. Chandler et al., 2006 finds 'SC' is consistently somewhat susceptible to Botrytis Fruit Rot, see also .

The varieties '', '' (not to be confused with the Florida Strawberry Festival), and 'Florida Beauty' are among the most commonly grown here. 'FR' is higher yielding in real producer conditions in the state than 'SF'.

Although disease resistance is an economically important trait in this crop, there is insufficient study of growers' Willingness to pay. What little information is available suggests that it is low. Unsurprisingly there is even less interest in resistance on the consumer side, due to lack of understanding.

Peach 
Peaches have probably been grown here since the 1500s, brought by the Spanish. By the late 1700s an export trade had developed with the mid-Atlantic states, with Baltimore the first hub to distribute Florida peaches into the surrounding region. Similar to the strawberry tool above, a cut-down SNP array for genomic selection has been adapted by University of Florida for peach.

Peach is a growing crop due to citrus greening. Florida produces far less than the leading state, California, but has the advantage of an earlier season than any other in the country. The harvest season runs from late March to late May or early June depending on the year's weather. Due to increasing pest and disease pressure with increasing rainfall here, yield declines rapidly in the summer and profitable harvest ends for the year. This  combined with competitor states coming into season  means that late-bearing cultivars are commercially inviable here.

Citrus 
Although citrus cultivation also began here in the 1500s, commercial scale production was only attempted in the 1920s. At first this went badly due to severe pest and disease epidemics, which were themselves due to poor understanding of the local climate and terrain.  oranges make up 93% of Florida's citrus production, followed by 6% for grapefruit, and 1% for tangerines and tangelos. For 2018, 10.9% of all cash receipts were citruses. In 2006, 67% of all citrus, 74% of oranges, 58% of tangerines, and 54% of grapefruit were grown in Florida. About 95% of commercial orange production in the state is destined for processing (mostly as orange juice, the official state beverage). The top 5 citrus-producing counties, according to data in 2019, was "DeSoto (12.8 million boxes), Polk (12.5 million boxes), Highlands (10.8 million boxes), Hendry (10.5 million boxes) and Hardee (8.16 million boxes)", according to Florida Agriculture by the Numbers. Together they contribute 71% of Florida's total citrus production. The Central produced the most citrus, followed by the Western area and the Southern areas. International citrus fresh fruit exports totaled to "2.05 million 4/5 bushel cartons", and Japan received the majority of the grapefruit exports. Canada received most of Florida's orange and tangerine exports. Florida Agriculture by the Numbers reports "4.70 million gallons of Frozen Concentrated Orange Juice (FCOJ), and 0.38 million gallons of Frozen Concentrated Grapefruit Juice (FCGJ) was exported in the 2018–2019 season".

Other crops 
The largest farm category by sales in Florida is the $2.3billion ornamental industry, which includes nursery, greenhouse, flowers, and sod products.

Other products include sugarcane, tomatoes and celery. The state is the largest producer of sweet corn and green beans for the U.S.

The Everglades Agricultural Area is a major center for agriculture. The environmental impact of agriculture, especially water pollution, is a major issue in Florida today.

The state has a near monopoly on saw palmetto berries, an alternative medicine used to treat prostate and urinary disorders.

Harvest is almost year-round, from October to June. The highest temperatures of the summer from July to September end profitable yield and even the heat of June and October limit productivity, such that April to May and November to January are the largest harvests of the year. Federal Crop Insurance for fresh tomatoes specifically excludes insects and diseases.

Okra is grown throughout the state to some degree however and so okra is available ten months of the year here. The Regional IPM Centers provide integrated pest management plans specifically for the southern part of the state.

Pests and diseases

Gray Mold 
(See also .) Occasionally yield losses can be over 50% in the state. Conditions favorable to the disease occur here from November to March, and its most severe destruction is in February and March. When making fungicide decisions about timing and ingredients, the UFl Institute of Food and Agricultural Sciences recommends the Strawberry Advisory System for a decision support system. Prophylactic fungicide dips don't work for this pathogen and so many in-season sprays are the only option. UFL IFAS recommends thiram, captan, captan + fexhexamid, penthiopyrad, isofetamid, fluxapyroxad + pyraclostrobin, fluopyram + pyrimethanil, pydiflumetofen + fludioxonil, and cyprodinil + fludioxonil. There is a massive problem with multiple fungicide resistance in this disease here, with most B.c. isolates showing two to six resistances and three being most common, with only fludioxonil providing any protection in many populations. Multiresistant B.c. caused a disastrous crop loss event across the state in 2012. Resistance management is thus extremely important and monotonous fungicide use is not an option. Resistance management is mostly incorporated into the Strawberry Advisory System already. Methyl bromide was an important part of production and its ban has greatly increased costs, both for soil fumigation with alternatives, and because further applications must be made during the season and post-harvest to make up for inadequate efficacy of these alternatives.

Other pests and diseases 
Citrus canker (Xanthomonas axonopodis) continues to be an issue of concern. Citrus greening disease is incurable. A study states that it has caused the loss of $4.5billion between 2006 and 2012. , it was the major agricultural concern. Results of the annual Commercial Citrus Inventory showed that citrus acreage in 2019 was down 4% than 2018 and was the lowest in a series that began in 1966. There was a net loss of 16,411 acres during the 2018–2019 season and was twice what was lost in the previous season. Of a survey conducted of 25 published counties, 24 of them, or 96% recorded decrease in acreage. Only Sarasota County showed an increase in acreage during the 2018–2019 season. Other major citrus concerns include citrus root weevil Diaprepes abbreviatus, the citrus leafminer Phyllocnistis citrella, and the Asian citrus psyllid Diaphorina citri.

Tomato, bell pepper, and strawberry were the largest users of methyl bromide and so the phase out has required hard choices for alternative soil fumigants. A methyl iodide/chloropicrin mix has served well, producing equal performance to MB in pepper.

The Spotted Wing Drosophila (Drosophila suzukii) is a threat to blueberry, peach, cherry, strawberry, raspberry, and blackberry here. D. suzukii was introduced to much of North America from its initial introduction to California, including to this state.

 is commonly caused by  here. Adaskaveg & Hartin 1997 identify the most common strains on strawberry here.

The  (Spodoptera frugiperda) is a major pest here. South Florida is one of only two overwintering areas for FAW in North America (the other being South Texas). Thus the entire state  and the south especially  is hard hit every year. Bt crops have been successful against FAW but some Bt resistance is appearing here which is a tremendous threat to productivity. Huang et al., 2014 find a high degree of Cry1F resistance (Cry1F-r) in the south of the state, probably the result of resistant FAW migration from Puerto Rico. This Cry1F-resistant population has low cross-resistance with Cry1A.105 but none with Cry2Ab2 or Vip3A. Overall, several studies find Cry1F-r is common here. Banerjee et al., 2017 does not find the Cry1F-r allele SfABCC2mut in Florida in 2012, 2014, or 2016. Because this allele is very common in Puerto Rico, they fail to support any substantial immigration of FAW from PR to Florida, contrary to earlier studies including Huang above.

The Medfly (Ceratitis capitata) was introduced here and to California and Texas. Due to its wide host range it was immediately an important priority for the states and for USDA APHIS. Using sterile insect technique it was successfully eradicated from North America entirely.

 is caused by Xanthomonas axonopodis pv. vesicatoria.  is produced by Pseudomonas syringae pv. tomato. Both are economically significant in fresh-market tomato here.

The  (SLW, Bemisia tabaci strain B) was first noticed here in 1986. Previously only the A strain had been known here, and was only occasionally a crop pest. Suddenly in 1986 SLW was a major crop pest and major vector of crop diseases. Since then Strain A has disappeared from the United States entirely and Strain B has continued to be a widespread problem here.

The  (Estigmene acrea) is a common pest of fruit and vegetable cultivation here.

It is a significant agricultural drag due to its soil disruption, its mound building interfering with field machines, feeding on the plants themselves, and attacks on livestock.

Treatments

Treatments in fresh-market tomato 
 (ASM) is a plant activator producing systemic acquired resistance (SAR). In a very widely regarded experiment Louws et al., 2001 used ASM to protect fresh tomato cultivation here against Tomato Bacterial Spot and Tomato Bacterial Speck. Over four years they treated with ASM as an alternative to copper bactericide and achieved almost total control with no yield loss. (Some fungicides were required to complement the bacterial control of ASM.) This result is spoken of worldwide when discussing basic plant biology, SAR, induced systemic resistance, the biology of Xanthomonads, and the need for alternative pesticides due to resistance, including phage therapy in agriculture.

Fishing
In 2009, fishing was a $6billion industry, employing 60,000 jobs for sports and commercial purposes. Florida aquaculture producers reported sales in 2018 of $72 million, according to a survey administered by the Florida Agricultural Statistics Service.

Government and military 

Since the development of the federal NASA Merritt Island launch sites on Cape Canaveral (most notably Kennedy Space Center) in 1962, Florida has developed a sizable aerospace industry.

Another major economic engine in Florida is the United States military. There are 24 military bases in the state, housing three Unified Combatant Commands; United States Central Command in Tampa, United States Southern Command in Doral, and United States Special Operations Command in Tampa. Some 109,390 U.S. military personnel stationed in Florida, contributing, directly and indirectly, $52billion a year to the state's economy.

In 2009, there were 89,706 federal workers employed within the state. Tens of thousands more employees work for contractors who have federal contracts, including those with the military.

In 2012, government of all levels was a top employer in all counties in the state, because this classification includes public school teachers and other school staff. School boards employ nearly one of every thirty workers in the state. The federal military was the top employer in three counties.

Mass media 

Broadband Internet in Florida is deployed by both government agencies and private companies. Examples of government agencies include the North Florida Broadband Authority.

Mining 
Phosphate mining, concentrated in the Bone Valley, is the state's third-largest industry. The state produces about 75% of the phosphate required by farmers in the United States and 25% of the world supply, with about 95% used for agriculture (90% for fertilizer and 5% for livestock feed supplements) and 5% used for other products.

After the watershed events of Hurricane Andrew in 1992, Florida began investing in economic development through the Office of Trade, Tourism, and Economic Development. Governor Jeb Bush realized that watershed events such as Andrew negatively impacted Florida's backbone industry of tourism severely. The office was directed to target Medical/Bio-Sciences among others. Three years later, The Scripps Research Institute (TSRI) announced it had chosen Florida for its newest expansion.

Real estate 
In the early 20th century, land speculators discovered Florida, and businessmen such as Henry Plant and Henry Flagler developed railroad systems, which led people to move in, drawn by the weather and local economies. From then on, tourism boomed, fueling a cycle of development that overwhelmed a great deal of farmland.

At the end of the third quarter of 2008, Florida had the highest mortgage delinquency rate in the US, with 7.8% of mortgages delinquent at least 60 days. A 2009 list of national housing markets that were hard hit in the real estate crash included a disproportionate number in Florida. The early 21st-century building boom left Florida with 300,000 vacant homes in 2009, according to state figures. In 2009, the US Census Bureau estimated that Floridians spent an average 49.1% of personal income on housing-related costs, the third-highest percentage in the US.

In the third quarter of 2009, there were 278,189 delinquent loans, 80,327 foreclosures. Sales of existing homes in February 2010 was 11,890, up 21% from the same month in 2009. Only two metropolitan areas showed a decrease in homes sold: Panama City and Brevard County. The average sales price for an existing house was $131,000, 7% decrease from the prior year.

Seaports and boating 

Florida has many seaports that serve container ships, tank ships, and cruise lines. Major ports in Florida include Port Tampa Bay in Tampa, Port Everglades in Fort Lauderdale, Port of Jacksonville in Jacksonville, PortMiami in Miami, Port Canaveral in Brevard County, Port Manatee in Manatee County, and Port of Palm Beach in Riviera Beach. The world's top three busiest cruise ports are found in Florida with PortMiami as the busiest and Port Canaveral and Port Everglades as the second and third busiest. Port Tampa Bay meanwhile is the largest in the state, having the most tonnage. , Port Tampa Bay ranks 16th in the United States by tonnage in domestic trade, 32nd in foreign trade, and 22nd in total trade. It is the largest, most diversified port in Florida, has an economic impact of more than $15.1billion, and supports more than 80,000 jobs.

Florida is the leading state for sales of powerboats. Boats sales totaled $1.96billion in 2013.

Tourism 

Tourism makes up one of the largest sectors of the state economy, with nearly 1.4million people employed in the tourism industry in 2016 (a record for the state, surpassing the 1.2million employment from 2015).

In 2015, Florida broke the 100-million visitor mark for the first time in state history by hosting a record 105million visitors. The state has set tourism records for eight consecutive years, most recently breaking the 120-million visitor mark for the first time in 2018 with 126.1million visitors reported.

Many beach towns are popular tourist destinations, particularly during winter and spring break. Twenty-three million tourists visited Florida beaches in 2000, spending $22billion. The public has a right to beach access under the public trust doctrine, but some areas have access effectively blocked by private owners for a long distance.

Data released shows 30.9 million visitors coming to the state from October to December of 2021, up nearly 60% from the same period in 2020 and topping pre-pandemic levels from the same quarter pre-pandemic.

Amusement parks, especially in the Greater Orlando area, make up a significant portion of tourism. The Walt Disney World Resort is the most visited vacation resort in the world with more than 58million visitors annually, consisting of four theme parks, 27 themed resort hotels, nine non-Disney hotels, two water parks, four golf courses and other recreational venues. Other major theme parks in the area include Universal Orlando Resort, SeaWorld Orlando and Busch Gardens Tampa.

Florida's many state parks and protected areas receive a lot of visitors as well with 25.2million visitors visiting Florida State Parks in 2013.

References